Psedomalus is a genus of cuckoo wasps (insects in the family Chrysididae).

Selected species
 Pseudomalus auratus (Linnaeus, 1758)
 Pseudomalus meridianus Strumia, 1996
 Pseudomalus pusillus (Fabricius, 1804)
 Pseudomalus triangulifer (Abeille de Perrin, 1877)
 Pseudomalus violaceus (Scopoli, 1763)

References 

Hymenoptera genera